This is a list of the longest multiple-segment buildings and walls (excluding those not intended for human occupancy) in the world.

World

Africa

Asia

Europe

Thermal power stations in the former Soviet Union often also have long buildings.

North America

Oceania

South America

Middle East

See also

List of buildings and structures
List of tallest buildings and structures in the world

References

 

Buildings
Longest
Longest
Lists of construction records